"Savior" is the third single from the Christian rock band Skillet's fifth studio album, Collide. It has been to date the band's fifth highest mainstream rock Billboard charting single, peaking at No. 26. The song is on the Digital Praise PC game Guitar Praise.

Track listing
 "Savior" (Edit) – 4:01

Charts
Savior peaked at No. 26 on the Billboard rock charts and No. 21 on the ChristianRock.net Annual Top 100.

Credits
 John Cooper – lead vocals, bass guitar
 Korey Cooper – keyboards, rhythm guitar
 Ben Kasica – lead guitar
 Lori Peters – drums

Video
The music video shows the band playing in both a house and at a park at night. It became only the second Skillet video to have a story in the video, after "Best Kept Secret," though the story in the "Savior" video is more heavily featured. The video shows an abusive father mistreating his children in the house, and the subsequent escape of the children from their father. They make their way into the park, while the location of the band playing switches from one to the other. The video ends with the children being safe in their mother's arms. The video is arguably the heaviest in theme in the band's career to that point. Lead singer and bassist, John Cooper has said that 'Savior' is a song written mostly about his childhood. Although he was not physically abused by his father, he had a very destructive emotional relationship with him. The end of the video shows that although Cooper and his father had a bad relationship, he had a very good relationship with his mother.

References

Skillet (band) songs
2004 singles
Songs written by John Cooper (musician)
2003 songs
Ardent Records singles